Manuel G. Herrera (3 December 1936 – 21 October 2007) was an American politician who was a Democratic member of the New Mexico House of Representatives from 1999 to 2007. Herrera attended Western New Mexico University and is a businessman. He also served as Mayor of Bayard, New Mexico and was on the city council. He died of prostate cancer on 21 October 2007.

References

1936 births
2007 deaths
Hispanic and Latino American state legislators in New Mexico
People from Santa Rita, New Mexico
New Mexico city council members
Mayors of places in New Mexico
Democratic Party members of the New Mexico House of Representatives
Western New Mexico University alumni
20th-century American politicians